This Is My Country is the seventh studio album by American country music singer Lee Greenwood. The album was released on May 16, 1988, by MCA Records.

Track listing

Personnel
Paul Franklin - steel guitar, dobro
Johnny Gimble - fiddle
Jon Goin - acoustic guitar
Greg Gordon - background vocals
Lee Greenwood - lead vocals, background vocals, tenor saxophone
Michael L. Holton - trumpet
Dann Huff - electric guitar
David Hungate - bass guitar
Chris McDonald - trombone
Rick Marotta - drums, percussion, congas
J.D. Martin - background vocals
Matt Rollings - keyboards
Dennis Solee - baritone saxophone
Larry Strickland - background vocals
Curtis Young - background vocals

Charts

References

1988 albums
Lee Greenwood albums
MCA Records albums
Albums produced by Jimmy Bowen